Alvastra Abbey (Alvastra klosterruin) was a Cistercian monastery located at Alvastra in Östergötland, Sweden.

History
Alvastra monastery was founded in 1143 by French monks who belonged to the Cistercian Order. A number of monks and lay brothers left the French monastery of Clairvaux Abbey.  It was founded at Alvastra  in Västra Tollstad parish in Ödeshög municipality on the site of the donation of land from King Sverker I of Sweden. 
The monastery church was inaugurated in 1185. For nearly 400 years  Alvastra monastery prospered. Varnhem Abbey (Varnhems kloster) at Varnhem in Västergötland was founded around 1150 by monks of the Cistercian Order from Alvastra Abbey.
Stefan, Archbishop of Uppsala (Stephanus) was a Cistercian monk from Alvastra monastery.

Alvastra monastery  was dissolved and appropriated by the Crown at the time of the Protestant Reformation in accordance with the Reduction of Gustav I of Sweden.

Gallery

References

Cistercian monasteries in Sweden
12th-century establishments in Sweden
Christian monasteries established in the 12th century
1143 establishments in Europe
Medieval Sweden
Monasteries dissolved under the Swedish Reformation
Ruins in Sweden